The Ontario provincial electoral districts each elect one representative to the Legislative Assembly of Ontario. They are MPPs, Members of Provincial Parliament. These districts are coterminous with the federal electoral districts, and are based on the 2003 Representation Order as defined by Elections Canada. The exception is Northern Ontario, whose districts are not equivalent to their federal complements, since the provincial government did not want to decrease the number of districts in Northern Ontario.

Current electoral districts
The following electoral districts are currently represented in the Legislative Assembly of Ontario. The average riding population was 108,482 as of 2016.

Note
 Population information from 2016 Census or Elections Ontario.
 Election results from Elections Ontario.

Defunct electoral districts

Toronto

GTA

Rest of province

See also
 List of Ontario general elections

References

Electoral districts, provincial
Ontario